Brin was a  built for and operated by Italy's Regia Marina during World War II.

History 
When Italy declared war in June 1940, Brin was the sole vessel in the 42nd Squadron of the Italian submarine fleet.

At the end of 1940, Brin, captained by Luigi Longanesi-Cattani, became one of several Italian submarines that operated in the Atlantic, based in Bordeaux (BETASOM) under German command. Brin was undamaged and escaped.

On 13 June 1941 she made three torpedo attacks on convoy SL75, succeeding in sinking two ships, the Greek Eirini Kyriakides (3,781 tons) and the British Djurdjura (3,460 tons). She performed five patrols from Bordeaux, sinking over 7,200 tons of allied shipping.

In August 1942 Brin contributed to the Axis opposition to the Pedestal convoy. During the action she brought down an Allied Short Sunderland flying boat. While in the Mediterranean, she performed 17 patrols.

At the Italian armistice, Brin was part of the Italian Fleet that surrendered to the Allies in 1943. She was subsequently used on training operations in the Indian Ocean for the remainder of the war.

Notes

References
 Bagnasco, Erminio (1977) Submarines of World War Two, Cassell & Co, London.

External links
 Brin (1938) Marina Militare website

Brin-class submarines
Ships built by Cantieri navali Tosi di Taranto
Ships built in Taranto
1938 ships
World War II submarines of Italy